Lusophones are peoples that speak Portuguese as a native or as common second language and nations where Portuguese features prominently in society. Comprising an estimated 270 million people spread across 10 sovereign countries and territories, thus called Lusofonia or the Lusophone world, is the community of Portuguese-speaking (Lusophone) world; these include Angola, Brazil, Cape Verde, Galicia, Guinea Bissau, Equatorial Guinea, Macau, Mozambique, Portugal, São Tomé and Príncipe, East Timor, Uruguay, Cochin, Azores, Madeira, Goa, Daman and Diu, Singapore and Malacca to various degrees.

The history of the Lusophone world is intrinsically linked with the history of the Portuguese Empire, although the Portuguese diaspora, the Brazilian diaspora and the Cape Verdean diaspora communities have also played a role in spreading the Portuguese language and Lusophone culture. Portuguese-speaking nations cooperate in politics, culture and the economy through the Community of Portuguese Language Countries (CPLP).

Etymology

The term Lusophone is a classical compound, wherein the combining form "Luso-" derives from the Latin term for an area roughly corresponding to modern Portugal, called Lusitania. The suffix "-phone" derives from the Ancient Greek word  (phōnē), meaning "voice".

History
Once the Portuguese mainland space had been established with the conquest of the Algarve, the last kings of the first dynasty dedicated themselves to organizing the national territory: they promoted settlement, agricultural exploitation, the creation of trade structures, the creation of defenses, not so much the south as east, &c. In this way, the Avis dynasty was able to engage in a new process of territorial expansion, which began in 1415 with the capture of Ceuta.

This was followed by the feat of the Discoveries, which involved the discovery of the archipelagos of Madeira and the Azores, the arrival in South America and various parts of Sub-Saharan Africa to Asia and the Pacific Ocean, such as Goa, Malacca, Macau and East Timor.

This long historical process has currently resulted in a cultural identity shared by eight countries, united by a shared past and by a language that, enriched in its diversity, is recognized as one. These countries - Angola, Brazil, Cape Verde, Guinea-Bissau, Mozambique, Portugal, São Tomé and Príncipe and Timor-Leste -, (in addition to the special administrative region of Macau) with their respective nuclei of emigrants, make the Portuguese language one of the most spoken languages in the world, constituting a community of more than two hundred and forty million people. Lusofonia can also be the platform from which the peoples who speak Portuguese today will be able to approach and expand the scope and action of the CPLP.

Language and ethnicities in Portuguese-speaking areas around the world

Other areas where Portuguese is also spoken

See also 

Geographical distribution of Portuguese
Geographical distribution of Portuguese speakers
Lusitanic
Lusophobia
 Lusophone literature
 Angolan literature
 Brazilian literature
 Latin American literature
 Portuguese literature
Lusofonia Games
Lusophone music
Lusophone name
Indo-Portuguese

References

External links

Words Without Borders explores Lusophone literature in translation
Flavours of Lusophony 

 
 Lusophone
European civilizations
Historical regions
Modern civilizations